The Electoral Judicial School of the Federal Electoral Tribunal is a Mexican educational institution dependent on the Federal Electoral Tribunal, which is specialized in training, research, and dissemination of information on electoral matters.

It offers postgraduate programs, training and update courses, academic events such as seminars, conferences, workshops, generates and manages specialized research on electoral jurisdictional matters, and coordinates editorial works.

Academic programs
The Electoral Judicial School of the Federal Electoral Tribunal's academic programs include various options on Mexican electoral matters:

Master's degrees in Electoral Law with professional orientation. 
PhD in Electoral Law
Diploma in Electoral Law
Masters Classes
Open courses
Online courses

See also
Federal Electoral Institute
Federal Electoral Tribunal

References

External links
Federal Electoral Tribunal website
Electoral Judicial School of the Federal Electoral Tribunal

Law of Mexico
Judiciary of Mexico
Elections in Mexico
Mexico